Longjing tea (Standard Chinese pronunciation ), sometimes called by its literal translated name Dragon Well tea, is a variety of pan-roasted green tea from the area of Longjing Village in Hangzhou, Zhejiang Province, China. It is produced mostly by hand and renowned for its high quality, earning it the China Famous Tea title.

Nutritional information
Longjing tea contains vitamin C, amino acids, and, like most finer Chinese green teas, has high concentrations of catechins.

Environmental requirements for growth

Water 
The overall water content of tea plants is 55%–60%, but the water content of new shoots is as high as 70%–80%. In the tea picking process, the continuous regrowth of new shoots therefore needs a constant supply of water. Therefore, Longjing tea trees need more water than ordinary trees. It is suggested that the growth and development of tea trees were most suitable when the annual precipitation was 2000–3000 mm, the average monthly precipitation in tea season was 200–300 mm, the atmospheric relative humidity was 80%–90% and the soil field water holding capacity was 70%–80%.

Temperature 
The annual average temperature suitable for tea trees is above 13℃, and the monthly average temperature in the growing season of tea trees is no lower than 15℃. And the most suitable temperature for the growth of Longjing tea is between 10℃ and 20℃. The growth of new shoots first accelerates with increasing air temperature, but when the air temperature reaches above 35℃, the growth of tea trees will be inhibited.

Light 
Longjing tea is light-sensitive and shade-resistant. It is forbidden to direct light and only tune to the specific level of sunlight. 90% ~ 95% of the dry matter in tea plant organisms is synthesized by photosynthesis, which can only be carried out under sunlight. The branches with poor light conditions developed weakly. The fully illuminated leaf cells are closely arranged, the epidermal cells are thicker, the leaves are thicker and firmer, the leaf color is relatively dark and glossy, the quality components are rich.

Benefits of production in Hangzhou 
Jiabin Wang is a tea research expert in Zhejiang Provincial Department of Agriculture. After years of research, he found that the temperature, light, relative humidity, rainfall and other conditions in the 28°~32° N are very suitable for the growth of Longjing tea trees and the best suitable area for tea planting. The southwest of West Lake area is located in the middle of the latitude, 30°04′~30°20′ N. In Hangzhou, the solar radiation is weak, the rainfall is more, and the temperature is lower. Especially areas around the West Lake Hangzhou is known for a mild, temperate, and often rainy climate, creating the perfect terroir to maximize flavor. In the picking season (the best picking period of West Lake Longjing tea is from late March to April, and the climate before and after the picking period has a vital impact on the quality of tea, including nutrition, tea polyphenols and amino acid content), the local temperature is basically between 10℃ and 20℃, which makes the tea buds of West Lake Longjing tea picked at this time smaller and higher in quality. West Lake Longjing Tea is planted in the surrounding area of West Lake, near Qiantang River where the local air humidity is high and has relatively low solar radiation which is the best condition for the growth of Longjing tea. Because of this climate advantage, the level of amino acids in West Lake Longjing tea is high and the level of tea polyphenols is low which creates its high nutritional value, and fresh taste.

Quality

Longjing is a relatively common tea and is often consumed by regular people daily, and is generally affordable. It is considered an artisanal tea and can be very expensive. The prices depend on the variety, of which there are many.  Longjing is divided into six grades: Superior and then 1 down to 5.  Infused leaves are a good indicator of quality, which is characterized by maturity and uniformity of the shoots harvested for processing.  High quality Longjing teas produce tender, whole leaves that are uniform in appearance.  Lower quality varieties may vary in color from bluish to deep green after steeping.  Before infusion, higher quality Longjing teas have a very tight, flat shape and light green color.  A study by Wang and Ruan (2009) found that one aspect of the perceived low quality of Longjing teas was a higher concentration of chlorophyll, producing a darker green color. The study revealed that free amino acids and theanine concentrations contribute positively to what is perceived as a good taste.

Legends
Longjing tea was granted the status of Gong Cha, or imperial tea, in the Qing dynasty by the Kangxi Emperor. According to the legend, the Kangxi Emperor's grandson, the Qianlong Emperor, visited West Lake during one of his famous holidays.

He went to the Hu Gong Temple under the Lion Peak Mountain (Shi Feng Shan) and was presented with a cup of Longjing tea. In front of the Hu Gong Temple were 18 tea bushes. The Qianlong Emperor was so impressed by the Longjing tea produced here that he conferred these 18 tea bushes special imperial status. The trees are still living and the tea they produce is auctioned annually for higher price per gram than gold.
There is another legend connecting the Qianlong Emperor to Longjing tea. It is said that while visiting the temple he was watching the ladies picking the tea. He was so enamored with their movements that he decided to try it himself. While picking tea he received a message that his mother, Empress Dowager Chongqing, was ill and wished his immediate return to Beijing. He shoved the leaves he had picked into his sleeve and immediately left for Beijing. Upon his return he immediately went to visit his mother. She noticed the smell of the leaves coming from his sleeves and he immediately had it brewed for her. It is said that the shape of Longjing Tea was designed to mimic the appearance of the flattened leaves that the emperor brewed for his mother.

Longjing, which literally translates as "dragon well," is said to have named after a well that contains relatively dense water, and after rain the lighter rainwater floating on its surface sometimes exhibits a sinuous and twisting boundary with the well water, which is supposed to resemble the movement of a Chinese dragon.

Legend also has it that to achieve the best taste from Longjing, water from the Dreaming of the Tiger Spring, a famous spring in Hangzhou, is to be used. The water quality of the spring now is certainly very different from before.  The tea takes its name from the eponymous "Dragon Well" located near Longjing village.

Authentic Longjing
There are various definitions of Longjing; however a common definition is that authentic Longjing at least has to come from the Zhejiang province in China, with the most conservative definition restrict the type to the various villages and plantations in the West Lake area in Hangzhou. It can also be defined as any tea grown within the Xihu District.  A large majority of Longjing tea on the market however is actually not from Hangzhou. Many of these inauthentic longjing teas are produced in provinces such as Yunnan, Guizhou, Sichuan, and Guangdong. However credible sellers may sometimes provide anti-fake labels or openly state that the tea is not from Zhejiang. Some tea makers take fresh tea leaves produced in Yunnan, Guizhou and Sichuan provinces and process them using Longjing tea techniques; and some merchants mix a small amount of high-grade with low-grade tea, and sell it as expensive high-grade.

Authentic Longjing tea tastes sweet, mellow and rounded. Some varieties are distinctly vegetal and grassy, and others carry a hint of roasted chestnut and butter.

Cultivar adds another layer of complexity to pricing. There are nearly two dozen of micro-varieties in Zhejiang province alone. The Old Tree (Qunti) and No.43 are the most revered and priciest, with pronounced aromas and tastes. Wuniuzao, also called the Early Longjing, is one of the earliest harvests and possesses a comparatively light and subtle taste.

Even the well-trained eyes cannot distinguish all the varieties and sources sometimes. That is why many cheap counterfeits can fool the most informed consumers. However, one should be able to discern some differences by comparing the appearance, scent and liquor of different varieties side by side.

Production Process 

Like most other Chinese green tea, Longjing tea leaves are roasted  early in processing (after picking) to stop the natural oxidation process, which is a part of creating black and oolong teas.  The actions of these enzymes are stopped by "firing" (heating in pans) or by steaming the leaves before they completely dry out. As is the case with other green teas (and white teas), Longjing tea leaves experience minimal oxidation. When steeped, the tea produces a yellow-green color.

Pick Times
West Lake Longjing tea picking has three characteristics: early, tender, and diligent.

Pre-Qingming Longjing 
 The premium early season first-picking known as Ming Qian or Pre-Qingming (or Before Ching Ming) Longjing tea requires it to be produced from the first spring shoots prior to the Qingming Festival on the 5th of April each year (approximately). In accordance with the Chinese farming calendar, which is a national holiday between April 1–4, it rains. After the rain the temperature heats up causing the tea plant to grow faster. When the tea bud becomes too big it begins to lose complexity in the brewed flavor, therefore the pre-qingming tea is considered best.

Guyu(Grain Rain) 
The tea picked before the arrival of Grain Rain in mid-April is also quite good, which is called Yuqian Tea.

Drying after picking 
 Longjing tea needs about half a day for drying on a bamboo sieve after picking and spread to a thickness of about 2 cm (0.8 in). This can reduce the taste of grass in tea leaves, make the moisture meet the requirements of frying, enhance the aroma of tea, reduce the bitterness and astringency, increase the amino acid content, improve the freshness and prevent the new tea from clumping during frying.

Frying 

Water-removing(杀青), also known as Green pot(绿锅), is the process of water-removing and preliminary forming. When the temperature of the pot reaches 80 ~ 100 C, put in about 100 grams of leaves that have been spread, and fry it with hands. It always start with grasping and shaking. After losing a certain amount of water from tea leaves, people should gradually change techniques to the pressing, shaking, and throwing for preliminary molding. The pressure is changed from light to heavy, achieving the purpose of straightening into strips and flattening molding. When tea leaves are parched to 70% to 80%, stop frying immediately. The whole process lasts for 12-15 minutes.

Areas
There are five peaks within Xihu (West Lake). Ranked in order of desirability they are Lion, Dragon, Cloud, Tiger and Plumb Flower.

Shi Feng Longjing: A type of Xihu Longjing from the Shi Feng (Lion Peak) production region. Fresh tasting, its fragrance is sharp and long lasting. Its leaves are yellowish green in color. Some unscrupulous tea makers excessively pan-fire their tea to imitate its color.

Cloud Peak is a government testing ground, and the tea from there is not usually for sale on the open market.

Tiger Spring Longjing: It is named from the best water source in Tiyun Mountains. This type of Xihu Longjing tastes wonderful even after repeated infusions.

Meijiawu Longjing: A type of Xihu Longjing from the area around Mejiawu village. This tea is renowned for its jade green color.

Bai Longjing: Not a true Longjing but looks like one and is commonly attributed, it is actually a Bai Pian. It comes from Anji in the Zhejiang Province. It was created in the early 80's and is a Green tea from a race of White tea trees and is hence very unusual; it is said to contain more amino acids than ordinary Green tea.

Qiantang Longjing: This tea comes from just outside the Xihu district. It is generally not as expensive as Xihu Longjing.

Protection outside China
龍井茶 / 龙井茶 / Longjing cha is protected in the European Union and the UK as a Protected Designation of Origin since 1998.

See also 

 List of Chinese teas

References

Chinese teas
Chinese tea grown in Zhejiang
Green tea
Hangzhou cuisine